John Irvin Kennedy (October 12, 1926 – April 27, 1998) was an American professional baseball shortstop. Kennedy was the first African-American player to be signed by and play for the Philadelphia Phillies, the last National League baseball team to support anti-Black segregation. The Phillies had fielded all-White teams through the 1956 season.

Career

Kennedy signed as a free agent with the New York Giants in Major League Baseball (MLB) before the  season, but was released prior to the  season. Kennedy caught on with the Birmingham Black Barons, and later the Kansas City Monarchs, both of the Negro American League. Near the end of the  season, with Kennedy having led the NAL batting race for most of the year, the Monarchs sold his contract to the Philadelphia Phillies.

Kennedy hit over .300 in the Phillies 1957 Spring Training. The team initially assigned him to their Schenectady minor league affiliate but without a starting shortstop for opening day, Phillies manager Mayo Smith told reporters on March 25, 1957 that "...if the season opened tomorrow, [Kennedy] would be my shortstop." Phillies general manager Roy Hamey told reporters the shortstop job was Kennedy’s. However the Phillies acquired Chico Fernández before opening day, and named Fernández the starting shortstop. 

When Kennedy made his big league debut (April 22, 1957 at Roosevelt Stadium), he became the first black player in Phillies history. The game was exactly 10 years to the day after Phillies manager Ben Chapman led his players in anti-Black verbal attacks on rookie Jackie Robinson at Brooklyn. Playing against the Brooklyn Dodgers, Kennedy entered the game in the top of the 8th inning as a pinch runner for Solly Hemus, who had doubled, but he did not score. The Dodgers won, 5-1.

Kennedy's next game was two days later, playing against the Pittsburgh Pirates at Connie Mack Stadium. He entered the game in the bottom of the 6th as a pinch runner for Harry Anderson, who had singled, and later scored on a bases-loaded triple by Ed Bouchee. The Phillies won, 8-5.

Kennedy got into a total of just five games, the last one on May 3, 1957. At the plate, he was 0-for-2, including one strikeout. In his two appearances at shortstop he had one assist, one error, and participated in one double play.

Kennedy played amateur baseball through his 50s and 60s in a men’s 30-and-over baseball league in Jacksonville, Florida. A granite marker was placed on Kennedy’s unmarked grave in Jacksonville in 2008. The Philadelphia Phillies recognized Kennedy's role in the history of the organization in a pre-game ceremony on June 29th, 2022.

See also
List of first black Major League Baseball players by team and date

References

External links

John Kennedy at Baseball Gauge
Baseball Integration Timeline

1926 births
1998 deaths
American expatriate baseball players in Colombia
Albany Senators players
Asheville Tourists players
Baseball players from Jacksonville, Florida
Birmingham Black Barons players
Des Moines Demons players
High Point-Thomasville Hi-Toms players
Jacksonville Jets players
Kansas City Monarchs players
Major League Baseball shortstops
Philadelphia Phillies players
St. Cloud Rox players
Tulsa Oilers (baseball) players
20th-century African-American sportspeople